Frederick Karl Esling (20 July 1860 Creswick, Victoria, Australia-31 July 1955 Box Hill, Victoria, Australia) was an Australian railway engineer and chess master.

Railway career
Esling was engineer-in-charge in the Way and Works branch of the Victorian Railways department, located at Flinders street. Among the many important works that Mr. Esling carried out were the building of the Flinders Street Viaduct, the replacement of the spans on the railway bridge over the Maribyrnong River, refurbishment of the Moorabool Viaduct, and the complicated lay-out of the tracks at the Flinders street station and yards. The new Maribyrnong Bridge which was built inside the old bridge without any interruption of the traffic was a fine piece of work that excited much interest in engineering circles. Esling resigned from his railway position in 1917 because he did not consider that in the matter of promotion he had been fairly treated.

Esling presided over the topping out ceremony on the Flinders Street station clock tower in 1909 when he laid the last brick and was presented with the ceremonial trowel.  He published a number of technical papers, including one based on his work on the Flinders Street viaduct which identified a puzzling problem related to the horizontal forces due to braking, in combination with side forces from wind-pressure.

Chess Master
At the age of 18, Esling won an offhand game against Adolf Anderssen. He won the first Australian Chess Championship by defeating George H. D. Gossip in a match in 1886. Gossip, having emigrated from England to Melbourne in 1885, issued a challenge the following year to any player in the Australian colonies to play him in a match for 20 pounds a side and the title of Australian champion. Esling, also a leading Melbourne player, accepted the challenge and won the first game, after which illness forced Gossip to forfeit the match. In 1950, shortly before Esling's 90th birthday, the Australian Chess Federation formally decreed that this match victory had made Esling Australia's first champion. Esling finished second in the Second Australian Championship, a tournament held at Adelaide 1887, with 7 out of 9 points, behind Henry Charlick (7.5) but ahead of Gossip (6.5).

In 1895, Esling challenged Alfred Edward Noble Wallace of Sydney, the reigning Australian champion, to a match for the title. It was played in Melbourne between 8 June and 11 July, and aroused great interest. Wallace narrowly won, winning seven games and losing five, with four draws. In a letter published in The Sydney Mail, he graciously wrote that "after the close fight we have had, I cannot as much as I would like to - think myself a better player than my late opponent, F.K. Esling, champion of Victoria".

References

External links

 Chess Note 5412, Chess Notes by Edward Winter

Australian civil engineers
Australian chess players
1860 births
1955 deaths
People from Creswick, Victoria